Bang Konthi is a district (amphoe) of Samut Songkhram province.

Geography
The district is slightly inland at the northwestern tip of the Bay of Bangkok. Neighboring districts are (from the east clockwise) Mueang Samut Songkhram, Amphawa, Wat Phleng, Mueang Ratchaburi and Damnoen Saduak, the latter three in Ratchaburi province. The Mae Klong river flows through the district.

History
In 1913, the district was enlarged by incorporating the district Mae Nam Om. Additionally, it was reassigned from Ratchaburi to Samut Songkhram. In 1914 the name was changed from Si Muen (สี่หมื่น) to Bang Konthi.

Administration
The district is divided into 13 sub-districts (tambons), which are further subdivided into 101 villages (mubans). Kradangnga and Bang Nok Khwaek have sub-district municipality status (thesaban tambon). There are also 12 tambon administrative organizations (TAO).

Sights
Bang Nok Khwaek is the centre of the Roman Catholic Diocese of Ratchaburi. The Nativity of Our Lady Cathedral was built in 1890 in French Gothic style.

Khai Bang Kung is a former river fort, which was of great importance during the late Ayutthaya and Thonburi periods. After being deserted for almost 200 years, a Boy Scout camp was established at the site in 1967, and a shrine was built commemorating King Taksin.

Wat Charoen Sukharam Worawihan is the most important Buddhist temple in the district. The main Buddha figure in the Ubosot (ordination hall) is  called Luang Pho Toa. It consists of a laterite core covered with plaster and gilded, and is in the style of the Sukhothai period.

Gallery

References

External links
amphoe.com (Thai)

Bang Konthi